Lophocampa secunda is a moth of the family Erebidae. It was described by Walter Rothschild in 1909 under the name fasciata. It is found in Brazil and on Cuba.

Wingspan is 28 mm.

Taxonomy

Since L. fasciata is preoccupied by Euhalisidota fasciata, described by Augustus Radcliffe Grote in 1867, Lophocampa secunda was proposed by Benoît Vincent in 2009 as the replacement name.

References

Moths described in 1909
secunda